Ludwig Lenel (May 20, 1914 – April 22, 2002) was an organist and composer.

Early life and education
Ludwig Lenel was born May 20, 1914 in Strasburg, Germany (now France), the son of the late Walter and Luise (Borckenhagen) Lenel. During his youth, he met and was strongly influenced by Albert Schweitzer, who frequently stayed with the Lenel family while visiting Heidelberg.

He then later studied organ with Schweitzer, and assisted him on tours of Germany and Switzerland in 1932 and 1936, respectively. In between those tours, Lenel's concert for two violins and string orchestra premiered at the Collegium Musicum of Heidelberg in 1933, and he then earned his diploma in 1935 from the Hochschule fuer Musik in Cologne. In 1938, he was awarded a diploma from Switzerland's Basel Conservatory of Music.

After emigrating to the U.S., Lenel worked as an organist and continued his studies in music composition at Oberlin College in Ohio, where he was awarded his masters of music degree in 1940. A resident of Illinois, Pennsylvania and member of the faculties at Monticello College and Elmhurst College, Westminster College in Pennsylvania, and the New School for Social Research in New York City, he eventually joined the faculty of Muhlenberg College in Allentown, Pennsylvania, where he taught for 27 years as a music professor. During his tenure, he created the music department's curriculum, and established the college's  major in music. Conductor of the College Choir, he initiated a concert series and took the group on tour, and also founded the Department of Opera at Muhlenberg.

Lenel retired from Muhlenberg College in 1979 and was awarded an honorary doctorate there in 1989.

On November 9, 1998, Lenel returned to Heidelberg to attend the performance of his main oeuvre, Death and Atonement, for narrator, violin, oboe, brass, piano and drums, in memory of the Holocaust. The 20-minute-long concert, written between 1976 and 1992, is based on Paul Celan's poem Todesfuge and texts by Nelly Sachs. Composer Wolfgang Fortner mentions Lenel, René Frank, Laurence Feininger, and others, as witnesses and examples of his teaching Jewish students before and during World War II in the attachment of his Story of Life in his de-Nazifiying file (Generallandesarchiv Karlsruhe).

Death
Lenel died on April 22, 2002 in Bryn Mawr, Pennsylvania. Funeral services were held May 24, 2002 in the Egner Memorial Chapel at Muhlenberg College. His obituary noted that he was the "former husband of Jane Lenel," and that he was survived by a son, two daughters, a brother and a sister, and three grandchildren.

Literature
 Anderson, E. Ruth. Contemporary American composers. A biographical dictionary, Second edition, G. K. Hall, 1982.
 Borroff, Edith; Clark, J. Bunker. American opera. A checklist, Harmonie Park Press, 1992.

References

Sources
 Rhein-Neckar-Zeitung Heidelberg 4. und 9. November 1998.
 Givannini/Moraw (Ed.). Erinnertes Leben – Autobiographische Texte zur jüdischen Geschichte Heidelbergs, Heidelberg 1998.

1914 births
2002 deaths
American organists
American male organists
German organists
Muhlenberg College faculty
Musicians from Allentown, Pennsylvania
20th-century classical composers
21st-century classical composers
American male classical composers
American classical composers
German emigrants to the United States
Contemporary classical music performers
21st-century American composers
20th-century German musicians
20th-century American composers
20th-century organists
Classical musicians from Pennsylvania
20th-century American male musicians
21st-century American male musicians